"Push the Feeling On" is a house song by the Scottish music group Nightcrawlers and American DJ Marc Kinchen (MK). The original version released in 1992 was also partially disco and acid jazz-influenced and was a minor chart hit in the United Kingdom. The song was later remixed extensively by Marc Kinchen, creating a series of additional remixes for the song. One remix known as "Push the Feeling On (MK Dub Revisited Edit)" became an international chart hit in 1995, reaching the top 10 in various European countries, including the UK, where it peaked at number three.

In the wake of its success, the band deleted the original version from their catalogue, reclassified the remix as the first single from their debut album, Lets Push It (1995) and changed their genre to house music. Despite the Nightcrawlers' Scottish origin, the song was actually less popular in Scotland than in the UK as a whole (and many worldwide markets), only peaking at number 11; mainly due to the more subtle and low-key style of the track, which differentiated it from the dance music popular in Scotland at the time such as bouncy techno. On the Eurochart Hot 100, "Push the Feeling On (MK Dub Revisited Edit)" reached number five.

Background and release

Original song
The original song was initially issued in the United Kingdom in 1992. The song reached No. 86 in the UK charts, before quickly falling off. A similar effect happened with the reissue in the US when it was released there in 1993, reaching No. 80 on the Billboard Hot 100. The song itself was rooted in acid jazz and disco, and the vocalist of the band John Reid noted later it was quite out of date for the time.

Marc Kinchen remixes

The original 1992 version's B-side was a remix by a new producer named Marc Kinchen. Known originally as "MK's Nocturnal Dub", the remix was renamed "Push the Feeling On (The Dub of Doom)" for its US release. This remix was a hit in the underground scene in the UK, being heavily played for around two years, until the same remix was later released as a single in 1994 in Europe. It proved to be a greater success than the original, reaching No. 22 in the UK charts, and No. 76 in the Eurochart Hot 100.

A later issue, entitled "Push the Feeling On (New MK Mixes For '95)" with a revised remix from Kinchen entitled the "MK Dub Revisited Edit" solidified the potential of the song - proving to be such a great commercial success internationally that it replaced the original song in both the minds of the public and the band, who subsequently focused on house music for the rest of their career, and deleted the original version from their catalogue, subsequently using the new remix on their debut album, Let's Push It and all subsequent releases.

Later remixes
In 2003 and 2007, the song was released again, in other remixed versions.

"Push the Feeling On 2014" was credited to Nightcrawlers vs DJ S.K.T. and appeared on various house music compilation albums and broke the top 40 of the UK iTunes chart.

In 2017, a garage version simply titled "Push the Feeling" credited to Nightcrawlers x John Reid featuring Big Narstie was released, alongside a lyric video. The official music video followed in 2018, in which Reid made cameo appearances.

The original CD single release (catalogue no. BRCD 258/864491-2) credits John Reid as 'Jon Reed'.  The 1995 release "New MK Mixes for '95" (UK cat. FCD 257, international cat. 854 275-2) credits John Reid as 'J. Reed'.

Critical reception

Original song
Larry Flick from Billboard wrote, "Dance act is making quick club inroads with this delightfully retro romp. A chunky, midtempo groove is dressed in snakey funk guitar licks, bright horn thrushes, and pulses of strings. Radio viability comes from the song's traditional structure and a contagious hook. Bolstered by prerelease interest on European import, cool track has the makings of a multiformat hit. Not to be missed." A reviewer from Lennox Herald described it as "confident sassy soul with good hook and chorus." James Hamilton from ''Music Weeks RM Dance Update commented that "the soulful John Reed led Glasgwegians get really classy with this Seventies-style chantingly harmonized joyful swirling and soaring brazzy jiggler".

Marc Kinchen remix
Scottish Aberdeen Press and Journal called the song "infectious". John Bush from AllMusic deemed it a deep-house hit and a house anthem. Larry Flick from Billboard stated that "Push The Feeling On" "is one of those records that simply will not go away." He noted Marc "M.K." Kinchen's "sinewy rhythms" of the remix. James Masterton said in his weekly UK chart commentary, "With hindsight it is easy to see why, as it is one of those dance hits to rank alongside the Source's "You Got The Love" and Robin S's "Show Me Love" - a simple but insistent rhythm upon which is built layer after layer of production to reach a rousing climax... watch it go Top 3." Pan-European magazine Music & Media wrote, "Third time lucky for the Brits who finally score a hit at home with the MK Dub Revisited Edit. In fact they're the creators of that "canned vibraphone" sound as popularised by Robin S." James Hamilton from Music Week'''s RM Dance Update described it as "a bouncily honking and jolting infectious 121.8bpm beefy strider that chops up Jon Reed's vocal into almost continuously looped gibberish lacking any quotable hook".

The remix was present on many retrospective top ranking lists of the best dance singles of the 90s, including Mixmags "The 100 Best Dance Singles of All Time", MTV's "The 100 Biggest 90's Dance Anthems of All Time" and Vibe's "Before EDM: 30 Dance Tracks from the '90s That Changed the Game".

Music video
A music video was produced to promote the Marc Kinchen version. It takes place inside of a photo booth and shows different characters entering and leaving. One of them is John Reid. The video was later published on Nightcrawlers' official YouTube channel in January 2015. It had generated more than 32 million views as of December 2022.

Track listing
 Original song (19 October 1992)
 "Push the Feeling On" (radio mix) – 3:32
 "Push the Feeling On" (extended mix) – 6:48
 "Push the Feeling On" (MK's nocturnal dub) – 6:22
 "Push the Feeling On" (MK's Deep Dawn mix) – 5:00

 MK Mixes (3 October 1994)
 "Push the Feeling On" (Dub of Doom) (Short) – 3:36
 "Push the Feeling On" (The Dub of Doom) – 6:41
 "Push the Feeling On" (Dub of Doom DDT '94 Edit) – 7:00

 New MK Mixes for '95 (20 February 1995)
 "Push the Feeling On" (MK dub revisited edit) – 4:04
 "Push the Feeling On" (The Dub of Doom) – 6:39
 "Push the Feeling On" (MK dub revisited) – 7:03
 "Push the Feeling On" (MK mix 95) – 7:06

Charts and certifications

Original song

Weekly charts

Marc Kinchen remix

Weekly charts

1 2003 remix
2 JCA remix

Year-end charts

Certifications

Marc Kinchen remix

Impact and legacy
The MK version of the track has been extensively sampled and covered:

In 2020, AJ Tracey sampled the track for "Dinner Guest" featuring MoStack which reached the UK top 10 singles chart.
Nightcrawlers and Riton collaborated to release "Friday" in 2021, which samples "Push the Feeling On" and features Mufasa & Hypeman.

Accolades

For "Push the Feeling On (MK Dub Revisited Edit)"

(*) indicates the list is unordered.

See also
 List of number-one dance singles of 2004 (U.S.)

References

1992 songs
1992 debut singles
1994 singles
1995 singles
2003 singles
2004 singles
2007 singles
Number-one singles in Zimbabwe
Nightcrawlers (band) songs
FFRR Records singles
4th & B'way Records singles
Island Records singles